Philip Kitchin (birth registered second ¼ 1941) is an English former professional rugby league footballer who played in the 1950s and 1960s, and coached in the 1980s.

Background
Phil Kitchin's birth was registered in Whitehaven district, Cumberland, England.

Playing career

International honours
On 3 April 1965, Kitchin played in the first ever Great Britain under-24 international match in a 17–9 win against France under-24's.

Kitchin won a cap for Great Britain while at Whitehaven in 1965 against New Zealand.

County honours
Phil Kitchin won caps for Cumberland while at Whitehaven, making his début aged-19 alongside; Brian Edgar, Dick Huddart, Syd Lowdon, William "Bill" McAlone and Ike Southward, against Yorkshire at Recreation Ground, Whitehaven circa-1960.

Honoured at Whitehaven
Phil Kitchin is a Whitehaven Hall Of Fame Inductee, i.e. one of the "Haven immortals".

References

External links
!Great Britain Statistics at englandrl.co.uk (statistics currently missing due to not having appeared for both Great Britain, and England)
Phil’s Kitchins hopes for West Cumbrian rugby league 

1941 births
Living people
Cumberland rugby league team players
Cumbria rugby league team coaches
English rugby league coaches
English rugby league players
Great Britain national rugby league team players
Rugby league five-eighths
Rugby league players from Whitehaven
Whitehaven R.L.F.C. coaches
Whitehaven R.L.F.C. players
Workington Town coaches